Sarah I. Avni is a Slovak artist, based in Prague. She is involved in artistic photography and interior design in addition to painting.

Career and education
Sarah Avni received her artistic education at Graphic Art School in Jihlava in the Czech Republic where she studied drawing and painting. She traveled through Europe, where she collected inspiration that has since made its way into her artistic work. She returned to Slovakia in 2006 and began to concentrate on painting and photography.

Given her positive relationship to travel and the fact that foreign peoples and cultures are an important part of her life and art work, she emphasized these bonds by continuing her education at the University of Central Europe from which she graduated in 2009 with a degree in International relations and diplomacy.

Artistic composition

Among other works she is also the author of a Slovak postage stamp to commemorate the World Cup in South Africa which was recognized with a 1st place award in the international STAMP magazine. She was involved in the interior design process for the Holiday Inn hotel in Trnava and completed a series of paintings for the car company Kia.

Exhibitions

2011 
 Galerie Harfa, Prague 2011
 Hotel Holiday Inn, Trnava, Slovakia 2011
 SPP Gallery, Bratislava 2011

2012 
 Presidential Palace, Bratislava 2012
 BMW (Tempus Bavaria), Bratislava 2012
 Royal Caffe, Prague 2012
 Iscare, Prague 2012

2013 

 Chateau d'Ax, Bratislava 2013
 Olympic Casino Eurovea, Bratislava 2013
 Sushi Roof Eurovea, Bratislava 2013

2015 

 Basel Art Center (Gift 4 You), Switzerland 2015
 Basel Art Center (Osteropäische abstrakte Kunst), Switzerland 2015
 Esterhazy Palace (Gallery Merikon Art Room), Vienna 2015

2016 

 Exhibition at the Slovak Presidency of the EU Council, Brussels 2016
 Fashion Club, Prague 2016
 Garden Agape, Bratislava 2016
 Chateau Rothschild, Austria 2016

2017 

 Slovak Institute, Vienna 2017
 The House of Arts, Piešťany, Slovakia 2017
 Embassy of the Slovak Republic, Ottawa 2017
 Crowne Plaza, Manhattan, New York 2017
 Bratislava Castle, Slovakia 2017
 Chateau Mcely, Czech Republic 2017

2018

 Slovak Institut, Berlin 2018
 Tatra Museum, Poprad, Slovakia 2018
 Rivington Street Gallery, New York 2018
 Slovak Embassy, Washington DC 2018
 Ottawa City Hall, Ottawa 2018
 Festival Re:publika dedicated to the 100th anniversary of the Czechoslovakia, Czech Republic 2018
 Kulturpark, Košice, Slovakia 2018
 Slovak Institute, Prague 2018
 Olympic Games, South Korea 2018

2019 

 Ella Design, Vevey, Switzerland 2019
 Hotel Carlo IV., Prague 2019
 Hotel Vienna House Andel´s, Prague 2019
 SC Central, Bratislava, Slovakia 2019
 Clarissine Church, Bratislava, Slovakia 2019
 Slovak Institut, Moscow 2019
 Gallery Vazka,, Trencin, Slovakia 2019
 MaxMara, Bratislava 2019

References

External links 
 Official website

Slovak artists
Slovak painters
Slovak women painters
Slovak photographers
Slovak women photographers
Year of birth missing (living people)
Living people
Slovak women artists